Martin Bradley (1886–1958) was an English professional footballer who played as an inside-right in the period before World War I.

Club history
Bradley was born at Wolstanton on the outskirts of Newcastle-under-Lyme, Staffordshire. Bradley began his career with South Kirkby he joined  Grimsby Town of the Football League Second Division in 1907. After a season at Blundell Park, he dropped down to the Midland League with Mexborough Town.

He signed for Sheffield Wednesday in April 1910 with whom he briefly returned to top-flight football and made two appearances for, before joining Bristol Rovers in May 1911, where he ended his career in the Southern League. His transfer to Sheffield Wednesday was part of a double swoop for the Sheffield club, who paid Mexborough Town £70 up front for Bradley and Laurie Burkinshaw, with a promise of a further £60 the following season if the pair went on to do well.

Personal life
Martin's son, Jack (1916–2002) played at inside forward for various clubs in the 1930s and 1940s, including Swindon Town, Southampton and Bolton Wanderers. His brother was James Bradley (1881–1954), who was a member of Liverpool's Championship winning side of 1905–06 and also played for Stoke in the 1890s.

In the First World War he served with the King's Own Yorkshire Light Infantry, and following the war with the Royal Army Service Corps, until returning to South Kirkby to work in the colliery.

References

1886 births
1958 deaths
People from Wolstanton
English footballers
Association football forwards
English Football League players
Southern Football League players
South Kirkby Colliery players
Grimsby Town F.C. players
Mexborough Town F.C. players
Sheffield Wednesday F.C. players
Bristol Rovers F.C. players
British Army personnel of World War I
King's Own Yorkshire Light Infantry soldiers
Royal Army Service Corps soldiers